Alex Eduardo Valera Sandoval (born 16 May 1996), better known as Alex Valera, is a Peruvian professional footballer who plays as a forward for Universitario de Deportes and the Peru national team.

Club career 

Before the 2020 season, he signed for Deportivo Llacuabamba.

On December 4, 2020, Valera reached a deal with Peruvian club Universitario and joined their squad on a 1 year contract.

On 1 August 2022, Valera joined Saudi Arabian club Al-Fateh on a three-year deal.

International career 

Valera was called up to the Peru national football team for the 2021 Copa América and made his senior international debut on June 17, 2021, coming off the bench in a 4–0 defeat against Brazil.

After Peru reached fifth place and qualified for intercontinental playoff against Asia's representative Australia, Valera was substituted in 116', in which the game was dragged into the penalty shootout; during the penalty shootout, he missed the final shot in the sudden death, and thus Peru failed to qualify for the 2022 FIFA World Cup, losing 4–5 on penalty to Australia.

International goals

References

External links

1996 births
Living people
People from Lambayeque Region
Peruvian footballers
Association football forwards
Club Universitario de Deportes footballers
Al-Fateh SC players
Peruvian Primera División players
Saudi Professional League players
Peru international footballers
2021 Copa América players
Peruvian expatriate footballers
Peruvian expatriate sportspeople in Saudi Arabia
Expatriate footballers in Saudi Arabia
Deportivo Garcilaso players